Seraikella  Assembly constituency   is an assembly constituency in  the Indian state of Jharkhand.

Overview
According to the Delimitation of Parliamentary and Assembly Constituencies Order, 2008 of the Election Commission of India, Seraikela Assembly constituency covers Seraikella municipality and Govindpur, Pandra, Manik Bazar, Tangrani, Pathanmara, Jordiha, Gurgudia and Badakakda gram panchayats in Seraikella police station, Rajnagar police station (excluding village 98-Dighi) and Adityapur police station. It is a reserved constituency for Scheduled Tribes. Kharsawan (Vidhan Sabha constituency) is part of Singhbhum (Lok Sabha constituency).

Members of Assembly 
2005: Champai Soren, Jharkhand Mukti Morcha
2009: Champai Soren, Jharkhand Mukti Morcha
2014: Champai Soren, Jharkhand Mukti Morcha
2019: Champai Soren, Jharkhand Mukti Morcha

Election Results

2019

See also
Vidhan Sabha
List of states of India by type of legislature

References
Schedule – XIII of Constituencies Order, 2008 of Delimitation of Parliamentary and Assembly constituencies Order, 2008 of the Election Commission of India 

Assembly constituencies of Jharkhand